is a Japanese manga series written and illustrated by Yasuyuki Kunitomo. It was adapted into a Japanese television drama series in 2012.

Plot

Characters
 Chieko Asakura (Minako Tanaka)
 Katsuhiko Asakura (Kazuhiko Nishimura)
 Yōko Takamura (Megumi Kagurazaka)
 Yōsuke (Taiko Katono)
 Kaori (Risako Itō)

References

1997 manga
2012 Japanese television series debuts
2012 Japanese television series endings
Futabasha manga
Japanese television dramas based on manga
Seinen manga